Attock District  (Urdu and ) is a district in Pothohar Plateau of the Punjab Province of Pakistan. Its capital is Attock city.

The district was created in April 1904 by the merging of tehsils of nearby districts. Its former name was Campbellpur. Today the district consists of 6 tehsils: Attock, Fateh Jang, Hazro, Hassan Abdal, Jand and Pindi Gheb.

It is located in the north of the Punjab province, bordered by Chakwal to the south, Mianwali to the southwest, Rawalpindi to the east, Kohat to the west, Nowshera to the northwest, and Swabi and Haripur to the north.

History 

The original name of Attock District was Attock. It was changed to Campbellpur after the Commander-in-Chief of British forces Sir Colin Campbell, who rebuilt the city of Campbellpur. The name Attock was restored in 1978.

Demographics
According to the 2017 census of Pakistan the district had a population of 1,886,378, of which 938,650 were male and 947,597 were female. 1,395,470 (73.98%) lived in rural areas while 490,908 (26.02%) lived in urban areas.

Religion 

As per the 2017 census Islam is the predominant religion with 99.51% of the population.

Language 
In the 1998 census, % of the population identified their language as Punjabi. Pashto was the language of % and Urdu – of %. 

In the 2017 census 64.93% of the population identified their language as Punjabi, 16.51% Hindko, 14.54% Pashto and 1.81% Urdu as their first language.

The Punjabi dialect of the eastern Fateh Jang Tehsil is called Sohāī̃ and belongs to the Dhani dialect group. The dialects of Pindi Gheb Tehsil (called Ghebi) and of Attock (sometimes called Chhachi) have been classified as part of Hindko.

Tehsils
The district of Attock is divided into six tehsils
 Attock
 Fateh Jang
 Hasan Abdal
 Hazro
 Jand
 Pindi Gheb

Union Councils 
District contain a total of 72 Union Councils.

Education
Attock has a total of 1,287 government schools out of which 51 percent (657 schools) are for female students. The district has an enrolment of 224,487 in public sector schools

See also
 Kamra, Pakistan
 Pothohar Plateau

References

 
Districts of Punjab, Pakistan
1904 establishments in India